Artena rubida is a species of moth of the family Erebidae. It is found in north-eastern part of the Himalaya, south-east China, Thailand, the Andamans and Sundaland.

External links
 Species info

Catocalinae
Moths described in 1863
Moths of Asia